The Minnesota–St. Cloud State men's ice hockey rivalry is a college ice hockey rivalry between the Minnesota Golden Gophers men's ice hockey and St. Cloud State Huskies men's ice hockey programs. The first meeting between the two occurred on 3 October 1987 but wasn't played annually until 1990.

History
While Minnesota and St. Cloud State both fielded varsity ice hockey teams since at least the early 1930s, the two programs never faced one another for over 50 years. Despite their campuses being just 65 miles apart, Minnesota was competing with the top tier colleges while St. Cloud were matched with the smaller schools. In the mid-80s, the administration at St. Cloud State decided to raise the profile of their college and hired legendary Gopher coach, Herb Brooks to head the team in 1986. He led the Huskies to their first ever NCAA Tournament appearance and, though he left for the NHL after the year, he set the program on the road to Division I play. The team was promoted to DI the following year and played their first game at that level against Minnesota. After a few years of playing as an independent, St. Cloud joined the WCHA in 1990 and the two programs became conference rivals.

The two played several times each season afterwards, with Minnesota carrying the balance of play for several years. Beginning in 1997, the two teams began facing one another with regularity in the conference playoffs. From '97 through '09, the Huskies and Gophers met nine times in the postseason. These frequent meeting had the effect of entrenching the rivalry between the two programs. After Minnesota and St. Cloud went their separate ways in 2013, the two were part of agreement to found the North Star College Cup, a Minnesota-based version of the Beanpot. The tournament didn't last long but both Minnesota and St. Cloud State continued their rivalry by scheduling one another in non-conference meeting more often than not.

Game results
Full game results for the rivalry, with rankings beginning in the 1998–99 season.

Series facts

References

External links
 Minnesota Golden Gophers men's ice hockey
 St. Cloud State Huskies men's ice hockey

College ice hockey rivalries in the United States
Minnesota Golden Gophers men's ice hockey
St. Cloud State Huskies men's ice hockey
1987 establishments in Minnesota